General elections were held in Belgium on 24 May 1936.
The result was a victory for the Belgian Labour Party, which won 70 of the 202 seats in the Chamber of Representatives and 39 of the 101 seats in the Senate. Voter turnout was 94.7%.

Despite the rise of far-right and far-left parties, Paul van Zeeland continued as Prime Minister leading a government of national unity, composed of the three major parties (Catholics, Socialists and Liberals).

Results

Chamber of Representatives

Senate

Constituencies
The distribution of seats among the electoral districts of the Chamber of Representatives was as follows. Several arrondissements got one or more additional seats. Roeselare-Tielt lost one seat, which was a rare occurrence since population generally increased throughout the Belgian territory with each census.

References

Belgium
1930s elections in Belgium
1936 in Belgium
May 1936 events